M. Sukumaran (1943–2018) was an Indian writer of Malayalam literature, best known for his novels and short stories with political undertones. Marichittillathavarude Smarakangal, Seshakriya, Chuvanna Chihnangal and Janithakam feature among his works and five of his stories have been adapted into films. A two time recipient of the Kerala State Film Award for Best Story, Sukumaran received the Kerala Sahitya Akademi Award for Story in 1976 and the Sahitya Akademi Award in 2006.

Biography 
M. Sukumaran was born in 1943 at Chittur in Palakkad District of the south Indian state of Kerala to Narayana Mannadiar and Meenakshi Amma. After completing his school education, he started his career at a sugar factory. Moving to Thiruvananthapuram in 1963, he joined the Accountant General's office as a clerk, after which he was also active in trade union activities as a member of the Communist Party of India (Marxist). His political activities led to his termination i 1974, reported to be the first time a central government employee was terminated by a Presidential order. Later, he was known to have been disappointed with the left-wing politics and his portrayal of a disillusioned politician in his novel, Seshakriya, resulted in his expulsion from the party in 1982.

Sukumaran was married to Meenakshi and the couple had a daughter, Rajani. He died on March 16, 2018, aged 75, at Sree Chitra Tirunal Institute for Medical Sciences and Technology, Thiruvananthapuram where he was undergoing treatment for heart-related illnesses. Rajani, is also a writer, writing under the name, Rajni Mannadiar.

Legacy 

Sukumaran, who was known to have started writing from the age of 16, published his first story, Mazhathullikal, in Malayala Manorama, in 1963, when he was 20 years. He continued writing until his death, occasionally taking long breaks in between, to publish three novels and over 50 short stories which include Sheshakriya, Chuvanna Chihnangal, Janithakam, Thookkumarangal Njangalkku, Marichittillaathavarude Smaarakangal, Para, Azhimukham and Vanchikkunnampathi. Five of his stories have been adapted into films, viz. Sanghaganam, Sheshakriya, Kazhakam, Margam and Unarthupattu of which he wrote the screenplay for Sheshakriya. He also wrote a biographical book, Swadeshabhimani, Kelappan, Abdur Rahiman, which featured the biographies of Swadeshabhimani Ramakrishna Pillai, K. Kelappan and Mohammed Abdur Rahiman, as a part of a biographical series, Mahacharithangaliloode.

Awards and honours 
Sukumaran received the Kerala Sahitya Akademi Award for Story in 1976 for his short story anthology, Marichittillathavarude Smarakam. The film, Sheshakriya fetched him his first Kerala State Film Award for Best Story in 1981; he would receive the award again in 1995 for the film, Kazhakam. In between, he received the inaugural Padmarajan Award for his book, Pithru Tharpanam. Kerala Sahitya Akademi honoured him again in 2003 with the award for overall contributions in 2003 and Sahitya Akademi selected his short story anthology, Chuvanna Chinnangal, for their annual award in 2006.

Bibliography

Novels

Short story anthologies

Non fiction

Filmography

See also 

 List of Malayalam-language authors by category
 List of Malayalam-language authors

References

Further reading

External links 
 
 
 

1943 births
Malayalam short story writers
Recipients of the Sahitya Akademi Award in Malayalam
Recipients of the Kerala Sahitya Akademi Award
Malayalam-language writers
Writers from Kerala
Indian male short story writers
20th-century Indian short story writers
People from Palakkad district
20th-century Indian male writers
Kerala State Film Award winners
2018 deaths
Indian screenwriters
20th-century Indian novelists
21st-century Indian novelists
21st-century Indian short story writers